The Coupe de France Final 2003 was a football match held at Stade de France, Saint-Denis on May 31, 2003.  In it, AJ Auxerre defeated Paris SG 2-1 with goals from Djibril Cissé and Jean-Alain Boumsong.

Match details

See also
2002–03 Coupe de France

External links
Coupe de France results at Rec.Sport.Soccer Statistics Foundation
Report on French federation site

Coupe De France Final
2003
Coupe De France Final 2003
Coupe De France Final 2003
Coupe de France Final
Sport in Saint-Denis, Seine-Saint-Denis
Coupe de France Final